was a government bureaucrat, entrepreneur, and politician in late Meiji period Japan. He served as second Chairman of the South Manchurian Railway Company, Mayor of Tokyo, Railroad Minister, and was a member of the House of Peers. He was also known as Nakamura Zekō.

Biography 
Nakamura was born in Aki Province, in what is now part of Saeki-ku, Hiroshima; however, as his father was a retainer of the Chōshū Domain, for political reasons Nakamura frequently claimed to be a native of Yamaguchi prefecture. He attended the First Tokyo Middle School (now Hibiya High School), where one of his classmates and close friends was the future author Natsume Sōseki. After graduating from the Law School of Tokyo Imperial University in 1893, Nakamura obtained a posting as a bureaucrat at the Ministry of Finance, and was sent to Akita Prefecture. He was later sent to work at the Japanese Governor-General of Taiwan, where he met his lifelong mentor, Gotō Shimpei.

After the Treaty of Portsmouth ended the Russo-Japanese War of 1904-1905, the Empire of Japan gained the former Russian territories of the Liaodong Peninsula in southern Manchuria, as well as the entire South Manchurian Railway. A new company was established to manage the railway and its extraterritorial properties (i.e. the South Manchurian Railway Zone), and Gotō Shimpei was recruited to head the new company due to his administrative experience and success in Taiwan. Despite Nakamura’s young age Gotō hand-picked him to be his assistant. In 1908, when Gotō was selected to become Minister of Communications, Nakamura succeeded him as Chairman of the South Manchurian Railway Company ("Mantetsu").

While Chairman, Nakamura continued to support Gotō politically as he went on to become Home Minister under the Yamamoto Gonnohyōe administration, and a leading figure of the Rikken Seiyūkai political party. Nakamura also maintained correspondence with his school friend Natsume Soseki, and invited him to tour Korea and Manchuria at Mantetsu expense in 1909 in exchange for publicity.

In 1917, Nakamura was appointed to the House of Peers of the Imperial Diet, and subsequently became Railway Minister in the Terauchi cabinet. Nakamura became Mayor of Tokyo in 1924 and made strenuous efforts towards the rapid reconstruction of the Japanese capital city still devastated by the Great Kantō earthquake of 1923. He was forced out of office in 1926.

Nakamura died of a peptic ulcer in 1927 at the age of 61.

References 
 
 
 Gessel, Van C. Three Modern Novelists: Soseki, Tanizaki, Kawabata. Kodansha International, 1993
 Lists of Japanese Cabinet Ministers

Notes 

1867 births
1927 deaths
People from Hiroshima
People of Meiji-period Japan
Members of the House of Peers (Japan)
Mayors of Tokyo
University of Tokyo alumni
Deaths from ulcers